Dertônio Ferrer (born 18 March 1897, date of death unknown) was a Brazilian cyclist. He competed in the individual road race event at the 1936 Summer Olympics.

References

External links
 

1897 births
Year of death missing
Brazilian male cyclists
Brazilian road racing cyclists
Olympic cyclists of Brazil
Cyclists at the 1936 Summer Olympics
Place of birth missing